Citarella is a surname. Notable people with the surname include:

 Joshua Citarella (born 1987), American artist, researcher and Twitch streamer 
 Laura Citarella (born 1981), Argentine film director and producer
 Ralph Citarella (born 1958), Major League Baseball pitcher